The 1958 National Challenge Cup was the 45th edition of the United States Soccer Football Association's annual open soccer championship.

Bracket

East

West

Final

External links
 1958 National Challenge Cup – TheCup.us

Lamar Hunt U.S. Open Cup
U.S. Open Cup